Pole Creek may refer to:

Pole Creek (South Dakota), a stream in South Dakota
Pole Creek Wilderness, a protected area in Idaho